USS Russell County (LST-1090) was a  in the United States Navy during World War II. She was transferred to the Indonesian Navy as KRI Tandjung Radja (2).

Construction and commissioning 
LST-1090 was laid down on 28 December 1944 at American Bridge Company, Ambridge, Pennsylvania. Launched on 24 February 1945 and commissioned on 2 April 1945.

Service in United States Navy 
During World War II, LST-1090 was assigned to the Asiatic-Pacific theater. She then participated in the occupation service in the Far East from 20 September 1945 until 4 January 1946.

She was decommissioned on 22 July 1946 at Vancouver, Washington and laid up in the Pacific Reserve Fleet, Columbia River Group.

She was recommissioned for the Korean War, 3 November 1950, at Puget Sound Naval Shipyard, Bremerton, Washington.

From 7 to 9 April 1951, she participated in the First UN Counter Offensive. From 1 to 7 September, Communist China Spring Offensive and UN Summer-Fall Offensive.

She also took part in the Third Korean Winter from 14 to 26 March and 7 to 30 April 1953. Korean Summer-Fall, from 1 to 2 May, 16 to 18 June and 20 to 27 July 1953.

Under provisions of the Military Assistance Program, she was transferred to the Indonesia in 1961, and served as Tandjung Radja (2).

Service in Indonesian Navy 
In 1973, she was severely damaged after being grounded.

Awards 
LST-1090 have earned the following awards:

 American Campaign Medal
Asiatic-Pacific Campaign Medal
World War II Victory Medal
Navy Occupation Service Medal (with Asia clasp)
National Defense Service Medal
Philippines Liberation Medal
Korean Service Medal (5 battle stars)
United Nations Service Medal 
Republic of Korea War Service Medal (retroactive)

References

 
 
 
 
 

LST-542-class tank landing ships
Ships built in Ambridge, Pennsylvania
World War II amphibious warfare vessels of the United States
Cold War amphibious warfare vessels of the United States
Korean War amphibious warfare vessels of the United States
LST-542-class tank landing ships of the Indonesian Navy
Amphibious warfare vessels of the Indonesian Navy
1945 ships